Sacha Dench is an Australian biologist, conservationist and adventurer. In 2016, she set a Guinness World Record as the first woman to cross the English Channel by paramotor. She is the recipient of the Britannia Trophy and winner of the Green Swan Award.

Career 
In 2016, Dench flew 7000 kilometres across 11 countries in a paramotor, for the purpose of tracking the migrating Bewick's swan from the Russian Arctic to the UK. During that time, she was working as a biologist for Wildfowl and Wetlands Trust.

She is the co-founder and CEO of Conservation Without Borders and, in 2020, became a UN Ambassador for Migratory Species.

In October 2018, she gave a TED talk entitled "The Human Swan" about finding your own passion. In February 2020, she gave a similar talk to the Scientific Exploration Society.

Her career as a biologist focused mainly on marine turtles, and she won the Australian free diving championship while diving for her work.

The journey was to start in near Glasgow on 21 June and take approximately six weeks to complete. July saw Dench flying above Cumbria before heading towards the coast of Wales, having received the support, amongst others, of actress Joanna Lumley.

On 20 September 2021, Dench was seriously injured in a crash in the Scottish Highlands, which was caused by two paramotors colliding. The pilot of the other aircraft, a cameraman, was killed.

References 

Conservationists
Australian biologists
Australian conservationists
Australian women chief executives
Australian women biologists
Living people
Year of birth missing (living people)